Chitarwata Post is a British era post of the Border military police in the Sulaiman Mountains in Punjab, Pakistan. It is located at the confluence of lar and bar mountain streams which form Vehowa river downstream of Chitarwata. Chitarwata Post is also the place where boundaries of three provinces meet, Punjab, Balochistan and the Federally Administered Tribal Areas.

References

Internal borders of Pakistan
Military history of British India
Geography of Punjab, Pakistan